Garveyism is an aspect of black nationalism that refers to the economic, racial and political policies of UNIA-ACL founder Marcus Garvey. The ideology of Garveyism centers on the unification and empowerment of African-descended men, women and children under the banner of their collective African descent, and the repatriation of the descendants of enslaved Africans and profits to the African continent.

Garvey put forward his dreams in response to the marginalization and discrimination of African Americans in the United States and the Caribbean at the time with the hopes of inspiring black Americans to proactively establish infrastructure, institutions and local economies rather than expecting such from the heavily prejudiced post-reconstruction American government.  The movement had a major impact in stimulating and shaping black politics in the Caribbean and in parts of Africa.

Garvey was fought by the African-American establishment in the United States. An investigation by the Justice Department, directed by J. Edgar Hoover, led to Garvey's arrest on charges of mail fraud in January 1922, and his projects collapsed. On the 18th of November 1927 President Calvin Coolidge commuted Garvey's sentence.

See also

Black Power
Back-to-Africa movement
Black nationalism
Black supremacy

References

Further reading
 

African-American history between emancipation and the civil rights movement
African and Black nationalism
Eponymous political ideologies
Fascism